Pohnpei International Airport  is an airport located on Pohnpei Island (formerly Ponape), the main island of Pohnpei State. It is close to Palikir, the capital of the Federated States of Micronesia.

The extension of the Pohnpei International Airport began in 2009, and it was anticipated that it would be completed in 2011. The Government of Japan has agreed to provide about US$29 million for the entire project. The project includes extending the runway by 228 m and improving the terminal facilities and apron. Enhancements will help prevent problems such as when a Boeing 727 cargo jet overran the runway and the airport had to be closed for six days in May 2008.

Airlines and destinations 
Like many islands within the region, commercial air service is rather limited due to small population and tourist traffic. The only current scheduled passenger services for Pohnpei are the United Airlines (formerly Continental Micronesia) Island Hopper flights operated with Boeing 737-800 jetliners between Guam and Honolulu (three times weekly in each direction), the Guam-Chuuk-Pohnpei flights and a flight to Port Moresby on Air Niugini. Also Caroline Islands Air provides charter flights around the region.

In addition to passenger services, Asia Pacific Airlines transports cargo (including U.S. mail) to and from Pohnpei.

See also

 Island Hopper scheduled air service

External links 
Pohnpei Visitors Center: Garden Island of Micronesia
Federated States of Micronesia Division of Civil Aviation

References

Airports in the Federated States of Micronesia
Airport
International airports in the Federated States of Micronesia